North Carolina's 22nd House district is one of 120 districts in the North Carolina House of Representatives. It has been represented by Republican William Brisson since 2007.

Geography
Since 2023, the district has included all of Bladen and Sampson counties. The district overlaps with the 9th and 12th Senate districts.

District officeholders since 1993

Multi-member district

Single-member district

Election results

2022

2020

2018

2016

2014

2012

2010

2008

2006

2004

2002

2000

References

North Carolina House districts
Bladen County, North Carolina
Sampson County, North Carolina